Heart of the Immigrants is an album by jazz guitarist Al Di Meola that was released in 1993.

Track listing
 "Nightclub 1960 " (Ástor Piazzolla) – 5:46
 "Vistaero" (Al Di Meola) – 4:36
 "Carousel Requiem" (Di Meola) – 6:18
 "Tango II" (Piazzolla) – 5:35
 "Under A Dark Moon" (Di Meola) – 5:12
 "Bordel 1900" (Piazzolla) – 4:33
 "Indigo" (Di Meola) – 7:05
 "Heru Mertar/Don't Go So Far Away" (Arto Tuncboyaciyan) – 4:39
 "Parranda" (Di Meola) – 4:26
 "Someday My Prince Will Come" (F.E.Churchill, L.Morey) – 5:12
 "Cafe 1930" (Piazzolla) – 6:16
 "They Love Me From Fifteen Feet Away" (Tuncboyaciyan) – 1:24
 "Milonga Del Angel" (Piazzolla) – 3:46

Personnel
 Al Di Meola – acoustic guitars, guitar synthesizer, synclavier, charango, voice
 Chris Carrington – acoustic guitar 
 Dino Saluzzi – bandoneon
 Arto Tunçboyacıyan – percussion, Turkish string instrument, voice
 Hernan Romero – voice
Recorded and mixed by: Roy Hendrickson

Chart performance

References

External links
Al Di Meola discography

1993 albums
Al Di Meola albums
Tomato Records albums